Ratnasundarsuri (born 5 January 1948) is an Indian Jain monk, activist and Gujarati language writer. He is well known for his lectures on spirituality and social issues.

Biography
Ratnasundarsuri was born at Depla village near Palitana (now in Gujarat), India to Dalichand and Champaben. His birth name was Rajni. He was initiated in asceticism in 1967 under Bhuvanbhanusuri. He was conferred the title of Acharya in 1996. He spent four years in Delhi starting 2006. In 2011, he started a petition to ban meat export from India. In July 2013, he filed a petition to the Rajya Sabha to ban sex education and online pornography.

Works
In spite of being a religious saint, he has written many visionary books for the socio-cultural upliftment of the individual as well as society at large. Till today, he has written 400 books on variety of subjects and holds the Golden Book of World Records for writing more than 300 books in a single language (Gujarati). Lakhi Rakho Aras Ni Takati Par is his most acclaimed book. It is translated in 20 languages including Hindi, English, Urdu, Marathi, French and German. His lectures on the television are popular.

Recognition
In 2017, he was awarded Padma Bhushan, the third highest civilian award by Government of India for his contribution in field of spirituality.

References

1948 births
Living people
Recipients of the Padma Bhushan in other fields
Jain acharyas
Scholars of Jainism
Gujarati people
Gujarati-language writers
Indian Jain monks
20th-century Indian Jain writers
20th-century Jain monks
20th-century Indian monks
21st-century Indian Jains
21st-century Jain monks
21st-century Indian monks
Śvētāmbara monks